The term natural history group refers to subjects in a drug trial that receive no treatment of any kind and whose illness is, as a consequence, left to run its "natural" course. The term stems from the natural history of an illness, which is the course and outcome of that illness in the absence of treatment.

First usage

In 1863, Austin Flint (1812–1886) in his report of the first-ever trial that directly compared the efficacy of a placebo treatment with that of an active treatment, spoke of "the natural history of [an untreated] disease".

Third arm

The natural history group is often referred to as the third arm of a controlled drug trial, from the simple notion that a trial constructed in this way has three, rather than two arms (the "active" and "placebo" groups).

The observed outcomes within this group are then compared with the outcomes manifested by a group that has been given the active drug, and with that manifested by a second group who have been given a dummy, placebo drug (thus, the natural history group is the trial's "third arm").

Notes

References
 Flint, A., "A Contribution Toward the Natural History of Articular Rheumatism, Consisting of a Report of Thirteen Cases Treated Solely with Palliative Measures", American Journal of the Medical Sciences, Vol.46, (July 1863), pp. 17–36.

Clinical trials